Drominagh  (Drom Aidhneach  in Irish) is a townland in the Barony of Ormond Lower, County Tipperary, Ireland. It is located in the civil parish of Terryglass, near Borrisokane. It is here that the Ballyfinboy River enters Lough Derg. Eugene Esmonde, a recipient of the Victoria Cross, was from Drominagh.

References

Townlands of County Tipperary